Compsoctena dermatodes is a moth in the family Eriocottidae. It was described by Edward Meyrick in 1914. It is found in South Africa, Tanzania and Zimbabwe.

The wingspan is 22–24 mm. The forewings are light brownish ochreous, indistinctly strigulated with brownish, sometimes slightly mixed with whitish between the strigulae. There is a fuscous dot on the end of the cell. The hindwings are dark fuscous.

References

Moths described in 1914
Compsoctena
Lepidoptera of South Africa
Lepidoptera of Tanzania
Insects of Zimbabwe